Alice Creek is a rural locality in the South Burnett Region, Queensland, Australia.

History 
Alice Creek State School opened on 19 September 1927. It closed on 1945. It was at 75 Alice Creek Road.

Education 
There are no schools in Alice Creek. The nearest primary school is Kumbia State School in neighbouring Kumbia to the north. The nearest secondary school is Kingaroy State High School in Kingaroy to the north-east.

References 

South Burnett Region
Localities in Queensland